Tereza Rachel (March 10, 1934 - April 2, 2016) was a Brazilian actress.

Biography 
Born in Nilópolis, in the Baixada Fluminense, the actress began her career in 1955, performing in theater, being directed by Henriette Morineau in Aurimar Rocha's The Elegant. The following year she received the prize for actress revelation of the Brazilian Association of Theater Critics, ABCT, for her performance in Prima Donna.

Filmography

Films

Television

References

External links
 Tereza Raquel at IMDb

1934 births
2016 deaths
Brazilian film actresses
Brazilian telenovela actresses
People from Nilópolis